The bigmouth buffalo (Ictiobus cyprinellus) is a fish native to North America, that is vulnerable and in decline. It is the largest North American species in the Catostomidae or "sucker" family, and is one of the longest-lived and latest-maturing freshwater fishes, capable of living 127 years and reproducing infrequently. Even at a century old they show no age-related declines, but instead improvements relative to younger individuals, making this species a biological marvel. It is commonly called the gourdhead, marblehead, redmouth buffalo, buffalofish, bernard buffalo, roundhead, or brown buffalo. The bigmouth buffalo is not a carp, nor is any other fish in the sucker family. Although they share the same order, each belong to different suborders and are native to separate continents.

The bigmouth buffalo is typically a brownish olive color with dusky fins, but can vary greatly in color across individuals including melanistic, golden, and even xanthic color morphs. Like other catostomids it has a long dorsal fin, but unlike all other extant species it has a terminal (forward-facing) mouth reflecting its unique, pelagic feeding ecology. Generally it lives in lakes, or in sluggish areas of large rivers. Bigmouth buffalo populations have been in decline in the northern extent of their range since the 1970s, including Minnesota, North Dakota, and Canada. 

A 2019 study documented their late maturity, centenarian longevity, and that several populations in northwestern Minnesota are comprised mainly (85-90%) of individuals more than 80 years old, indicating recruitment failure since the 1930s. A 2021 study from North Dakota also revealed a slow pace of life including late maturity, decadal episodic recruitment, and a relatively large group of old-growth individuals. A 2022 study from Saskatchewan, Canada revealed remarkable tendencies of the bigmouth buffalo including a supercentenarian lifespan, skip-spawning related to water levels, proximate mechanisms underlying failed recruitment, extreme episodic recruitment, and late maturity -  all characteristics that make this species extremely vulnerable to overfishing, habitat degradation, and invasive species. Indeed, bigmouth buffalo are declining in Canada, and have been in steep decline in contiguous areas of the US since the rise of modern bowfishing in the 21st Century. Their life history attributes, including the ability to survive several decades with no successful recruitment (i.e. episodic recruitment), are more pronounced than other long-lived freshwater fishes, including sturgeon and paddlefish. Such species require time to successfully sustain themselves, surviving to periods in which favorable environmental conditions arise that allow for booms in reproduction and subsequent recruitment. Management of bigmouth buffalo is thus in dire need of change, especially in the northern part of their US range where populations are old-growth and declining; harvest remains unlimited and unmanaged, and night bowfishing has been growing as a significant sport fishery with increasingly-efficient technologies of the 21st century.

Geographic distribution
The bigmouth buffalo's native distribution is confined to the countries of Canada and the United States of America. It is native to the Red River of the North and Mississippi River drainage basins, from Manitoba, Canada, and North Dakota, United States, to the Ohio River and south in the Mississippi River system to Texas and Alabama. In Canada, they inhabit the Milk River which flows through Alberta, and the Qu'Appelle River which flows through Saskatchewan and Manitoba into Lake Winnipeg.  Beginning in the northern United States, they are native to Montana, North Dakota, Minnesota, Wisconsin, and down to southern states including eastern Texas, Oklahoma and Louisiana. The major systems where they are found include the Hudson Bay and Mississippi River drainages. The introduction of bigmouth buffalo has largely been done for commercial purposes. Regions of reintroductions include some reservoirs along the Missouri River drainage of North Dakota and Montana. Regions of introduction include some reservoirs in Arizona, and within California, they have also been introduced to the aqueduct system of Los Angeles.

Ecological, cultural, and economic importance 
Native to North America, bigmouth buffalo are integral to ecosystems therein. Bigmouth buffalo young are prey for several predatory fish, including walleye, northern pike, catfish, alligator gar, etc. Bigmouth buffalo filter-feed on invasive zebra mussels during the mollusk's larval (veliger) planktonic stage. They form the native counterpart to the invasive bighead and silver carp, and they compete with the invasive common carp. However, these invasive species are outcompeting native bigmouth buffalo. Native Americans utilized bigmouth buffalo, Lewis and Clark harvested them on their journey in 1804, and the inland commercial fishing industry has valued them as a prized catch since the 1800s. The bigmouth buffalo is a popular foodfish throughout the United States, and has been introduced into a few southwestern states. Commercial harvesters have to obtain annual permits to net from designated waterbodies, which are rotated among on a year-by-year basis, and they must report harvest from each haul to their respective state agency. Bigmouth buffalo are then trucked in oxygenated water tanks to markets where they are sold alive. Though it has small bones suspended in its muscle tissue like northern pike, its good flavor makes it one of the most valuable of the traditional, non-game freshwater fish. In addition to being a foodfish, the bigmouth buffalo has recently become a sportfish, as night and day bowfishing have become increasingly popular in the 21st Century. Although commercial harvest is regulated, sport bowfishing remains unchecked, even as wanton waste is pervasive.

Ecology

The bigmouth buffalo is part of a rather unique ecology in shallow-water systems. The larval bigmouths are pelagic and sometimes benthic feeders, mostly of copepods and cladocerans, but also phytoplankton and chironomids. Bigmouth buffalo, unlike its close relatives the black and smallmouth buffalos, is a filter-feeder, using its very fine gill rakers to strain plankton from the water. It sometimes feeds near the bottom, using short up-and down movements to filter from the water the plankton that hover near the bottom or rest lightly on it. The juveniles and adults are mostly limnetic plankton feeders that also eat cladocerans, copepods, algae, chironomids, ostracods, and other insect larvae and invertebrates depending on availability. The optimum habitat for spawning bigmouth buffalo is highly vegetated waters. They are a very resilient fish that can tolerate high turbidity and low oxygen levels. They can be found in waters with turbidity levels over 100 ppm. A minimum total dissolved solids is 200 ppm during the growing season. During spring and summer, 50–75% pools should be present, with backwaters, and marsh areas and 25-75% littoral area and protected embayments during summer for the habitat to be suitable. The bigmouth buffalo prefers slow-moving water that does not reach a velocity over 30 cm/s. 

The bigmouth buffalo are group spawners which produce 250,000 eggs/kg of adult weight; their eggs are about 1.5 mm in diameter. The bigmouth buffalo is a broadcaster that has adhesive eggs, which it lays in vegetated waters. Females seek submergent and emergent vegetation, the ideal habitat for the hatching of their eggs. Water levels substantially rise before spawning.

Salinity can be a problem for reproduction. Spawning can occur from 1.4 to 2.0 ppt of salinity which eggs and yearlings not being able to survive a salinity of over 9 ppt. The minimum dissolved oxygen during the spring and summer is 5 mg/L.

Recruitment success is related to water-level and drought conditions, as well as the water-level recession rate after the spring peak. More than one male will assist in spawning by moving the female to the top of the water to help mix eggs and milt.

Life history 
Reaching a recorded maximum of 127 years of age, the bigmouth buffalo is currently the longest living freshwater teleost (a group of more than 12,000 species) by more than 50 years, shattering all previous records for this group. With a previous maximum longevity estimate (prior to 2019) for this species at 26 years, evidence of its extended longevity came as a surprise and was initially met with skepticism. Thorough bomb radiocarbon dating was conducted on their otolith microstructure and confirmed the age estimates generated from thin-sectioned otoliths, making bigmouth buffalo the oldest age-validated freshwater fish in the world.

The onset of sexual maturity of bigmouth buffalo likely varies with latitude. In central North Dakota and southern Minnesota, females begin to mature around 10 years old, while males begin maturation around 6 years of age. In Canada, bigmouth buffalo females had not yet reached the onset of sexual maturity by an age of 11 years. Their delayed maturity (in addition to their great longevity and episodic recruitment) is a trait indicative of their slow, marathon-like, life history pace. Bigmouth buffalo have a tendency to accumulate unique pigmentation (orange and black spots) as they age, but this may vary by habitat depending on water quality and food intake.

Conservation status in need of change

The bigmouth buffalo's conservation status is in urgent need of change. The bigmouth buffalo is negatively affected by dams that restrict their movement and ability to find suitable spawning habitat, they are also prone to winterkill, and they are highly vulnerable to overfishing. The bigmouth buffalo is an endangered fish species in Pennsylvania. Besides this state, the bigmouth buffalo is not currently listed as threatened or endangered in any other region of its native distribution, even though they have had Special Concern status in Canada since the 1980s due to contiguous declines that have also been evident in the northern extent of their US range since the 1970s. Surprisingly, several longstanding MN populations are composed almost totally (85-90%) of individuals hatched before 1940, while harvest limits do not exist in these same areas - this despite the rapidly growing new sport of modernized night bowfishing that exploits this species. Indeed, the rise of bowfishing was found to be coincident with steep declines in bigmouth buffalo. The fingerlings are susceptible to a parasite, Lernea cyprinacae, but most are unaffected by the time they reach a length of 30 mm. They are anchor parasites that attach themselves between scale margins and fin insertions. The real problem is a secondary infection that may arise due to these parasites, especially in poor water conditions. The protozoan Epistylis and bacteria Flavobacterium columnare are both related to serious parasite infestations. The bigmouth has been seen to hybridize in the wild with smallmouth buffalo, and it is possible that some fish identified as black buffalo are indeed these hybrids. The hybridization does not seem to be negatively affecting their populations but makes it difficult to determine how many hybrids and how many black buffalo are actually in certain reservoirs. The fish is vulnerable in shallow water and is often captured by bow and arrow. It is commercially caught on trotlines, setlines, hoop and trammel nets, and seines. There are currently no found specific management plans for the bigmouth buffalo either privately or governmentally funded in the US despite the urgent need. In some places like the southern US, progeny have been reared in hatcheries.

Records 
On June 21, 2013, Noah LaBarge (13 years old) caught the Wisconsin state record bigmouth buffalo fish. It was caught on an 8-lb-test line on the Wisconsin River at Devil's Elbow, which is on the north end of the Petenwell Flowage. It was officially recognized to be the new world record by the National Fresh Water Fishing Hall of Fame as both 8-lb-line class and all tackle.

At Mt. Juliet, Tennessee, Jeff Wilkins caught a record  bigmouth buffalo while fishing on Percy Priest Lake. According to the Tennessee Wildlife Resources Agency, it took 35 minutes for Wilkins to reel in the fish. After the record was certified, Wilkins released the fish back into the lake.

In Omaha, Nebraska, Joe Slavic caught a  bigmouth buffalo using mulberry bait on June 8, 2000 in a Dodge County sand pit.

See also
 Haff disease

References

External links

Ictiobus
Taxa named by Achille Valenciennes
Fish described in 1844
Freshwater fish of North America